Two destroyers of the Imperial Japanese Navy were named Yūnagi:

 , a  launched in 1906 and scrapped in 1924
 , a  launched in 1924 and sunk in 1944

Imperial Japanese Navy ship names
Japanese Navy ship names